Manoel Bergström Lourenço Filho (March 10, 1897, Porto Ferreira, Brazil – August 3, 1970, Rio de Janeiro, Brazil) was a Brazilian educator and education theorist.

He was heavily criticized for collaborating with Getúlio Vargas' Estado Novo. His work reveals several facets of the intellectual educator, extremely active and concerned about the school in its social context and classroom activities. Lourenço Filho was a supporter of eugenics, who believed that white people were superior to black people, concluding by means of "researches" that skin color was directly related to intellectual ability, saying that black children should study in separate rooms from white children.

Biography
Born in the interior of the state of São Paulo, being the eldest of eight children, Lourenço Filho was educated by the influence of his father, the Portuguese Manuel Lourenço Júnior, a creative merchant and avid entrepreneur, married to the Swedish Ida Christina Bergström. As a boy, he was in contact with a vast literature, he became a compulsive reader.

See also
 Paulo Freire
 Hélio Lourenço de Oliveira

1897 births
1970 deaths
People from Porto Ferreira
Brazilian people of Portuguese descent
Brazilian people of Swedish descent
Brazilian educators
Brazilian educational theorists
Educational psychologists